Kipkemboi is both a surname and a given name of Kenyan origin that stems from the name Kemboi and the prefix Kip- (meaning "born of or born during"). Kipkemboi therefore means "born at night" Notable people with the name include:

Kipkemboi Kimeli (1966–2010), Kenyan long-distance track runner and 1988 Olympic medallist
Ibrahim Kipkemboi Hussein (born 1958), Kenyan marathon runner and three-time Boston Marathon champion
John Kipkemboi Kibowen (born 1969), Kenyan long-distance runner and two-time world champion in cross country
Richard Kipkemboi Mateelong (born 1983), Kenyan steeplechase runner and 2008 Olympic medallist
Simeon Kipkemboi (born 1960), Kenyan sprinter
Wilfred Kipkemboi Bungei (born 1980), Kenyan 800 metres runner and 2008 Olympic champion

See also
Kemboi

Kalenjin names